Sir John Denham (1559–1639) was an English-born judge who spent part of his career in Ireland. He is chiefly remembered now as one of the "Ship-money judges" who decided the so-called Ship Money case, Rex v. Hampden. He was the father of the poet Sir John Denham.

Background 
He was born in 1559 to William Denham (died 1583) and his wife Joan (died 1589); his father was a goldsmith in London, and later lived at Thorpe, Surrey. John entered Lincoln's Inn in August 1579. He was called to the Bar in 1587 and became a bencher of Lincoln's Inn in 1603.  In 1604, he purchased an estate in Egham, Surrey, which was to become his permanent home. He became serjeant-at-law in 1609. He was steward of Eton College, and also acted as counsel to the school.

Career in Ireland 
In 1609 he was knighted and sent to Ireland as Chief Baron of the Irish Exchequer. He made vigorous efforts to bring the procedures of the Irish Court into line with those of its English counterpart. A serious difficulty was that the other Barons were said to be old and infirm. In 1612 he was appointed Lord Chief Justice of the King's Bench in Ireland, and he was made also a member of the Privy Council of Ireland. He was a leading supporter of the policy of extending the English common law system to the whole of Ireland, and criticised the widespread use of palatine Courts by powerful nobles, which deterred subjects from by bringing their cases to the royal courts.

He was regarded by Sir Arthur Chichester, the Lord Deputy of Ireland, as a valuable ally and was sent by him to England in 1613 to defend the proceedings of the Parliament of Ireland from attacks on it by the Roman Catholic members of the House of Commons, who were still a numerous and quite influential party. He fully shared Chichester's hostility to the Roman Catholic faith, and his determination to strictly enforce the Penal Laws despite strong opposition from the Catholic upper and middle classes. Despite his frequent complaints of ill-health he regularly travelled on assize. He was also a Commissioner for the Plantation of Ulster, and after Chichester's dismissal in 1615 he was one of the Lords Justices of Ireland.

He was credited with greatly increasing the Irish revenues, at a time when the Crown was heavily in debt, and was praised by Francis Bacon for his hard work and prudence as a judge in Ireland. Even after his return to England he advised the Crown on Ireland, and in 1623 was appointed to the newly created  committee of the Privy Council on Irish affairs.

The case of Ship Money 
In 1617 Denham returned to England to take up office as a Baron of the Exchequer. As such he was one of the judges in  the celebrated Case of Ship Money,
Rex v. John Hampden, which concerned the prerogative of the King to levy the tax on his simple assertion that a need for it existed. When King Charles I in 1636 first consulted the twelve High Court judges on his power to levy ship money, Denham was one of ten of them who advised that it was the King's royal prerogative to determine whether the national good required the imposition of the tax.

By the time the case of John Hampden was heard by the Court of Exchequer in 1637, Denham is known to have been increasingly doubtful about the legality of ship money; indeed it was due to Denham's doubts that the Lord Chief Baron, Sir Humphrey Davenport, decided to remove the case to the Court of Exchequer Chamber, where it would be heard by twelve rather than the usual four judges. When the twelve came to give judgement, Denham was one of the five who voted in favour of Hampden. Although he was then so ill "of my old disease" (probably the "severe ague"  which had afflicted him while on assize the previous year), that he could not leave home, he sent in a short opinion that "the King's Majesty..... can neither take any lands or goods of any of his subjects but only upon a judgment on record."

Had he lived longer his opinion would very likely have saved him from being impeached, as most of his surviving colleagues were; in the event, he died at his home at Egham, Surrey, the following year.

Family 
Denham married firstly Cicely, widow of Richard Kellefet of Egham, a Groom of the Royal Bedchamber, and secondly Eleanor Moore, daughter of Garret Moore, 1st Viscount Moore, by his wife Mary, daughter of Sir Henry Colley. He and Eleanor had one surviving son, the celebrated poet Sir John Denham (portrait below). Eleanor died in childbirth in 1619. His son's passion for gambling is said to have caused him a good deal of worry in his last years: the younger John, who was still living with his parents, was by then married to Ann Cotton, and had a growing family. He is said to have squandered several thousand pounds on gaming.

Denham and both his wives were buried at St. John's Church, Egham: the present St John's Church is a much later structure.

His last direct descendant was his great-granddaughter Mary, Countess of Derby, who died in 1752.

References 

English barristers
Lawyers from London
1559 births
1639 deaths
Members of Lincoln's Inn
Lords chief justice of Ireland
People from Egham
Chief Barons of the Irish Exchequer